Edida Nageswara Rao (24 April 1934 – 4 October 2015) was an Indian film producer in Telugu cinema. He owned the film production house Poornodaya Movie Creations in Tollywood. He produced Sankarabharanam, Swayam Krushi, Siri Siri Muvva and Swati Mutyam, which were showcased at the Moscow Film Festival. He won five Nandi Awards.

Career 
Rao produced films with a classical and realistic touch, in the 1970s and 1980s. Almost all of the films he produced went on to win National Film Awards. He was born to Sattiraju Naidu, in a Telugu Naidu family. 

Some of his most memorable films, in Telugu cinema, are his collaborations with K. Viswanath, Bharathiraja, and Vamsy. These were films that showed the artistic values of Telugu cinema, such as, Sankarabharanam (1980), Seethakoka Chilaka (1981), Sagara Sangamam (1983), Sitaara (1984), and Swathi Muthyam (1986). Most of the films he produced won big at the Nandi Awards, Filmfare Awards South, and National Film Awards. They were also screened at several International Film Festivals. These were also dubbed and released in the Russian language. 

He started his career as a theatre actor, film actor, and dubbing artist and then ventured into film producing. After getting retired from the film production, he also worked as Telugu Film producer's Council Secretary, Nandi Awards Committee Chairman and National Film Award Committee member.

Edida Nageswara Rao died on 4 October 2015, at the age of 81, at a private hospital, while undergoing treatment for old-age related ailments.

Filmography 
Actor
 Bantrotu Bharya (1974)

Producer

Awards 
 Life Time Achievement Award - Sangam Academy

Nandi Awards
Best Feature Film - Gold - Sankarabharanam (1980)
Best Feature Film - Gold - Seethakoka Chiluka (1981)
Third Best Feature Film - Bronze - Saagara Sangamam (1983)
Best Feature Film - Gold - Swathi Muthyam (1986)
Third Best Feature Film - Bronze - Aapadbandhavudu (1992)

References 

Telugu film producers
2015 deaths
1934 births
People from East Godavari district
Male actors in Telugu cinema
Indian male film actors
Followers of Meher Baba
Film producers from Andhra Pradesh
20th-century Indian male actors
Male actors from Andhra Pradesh
Producers who won the Best Popular Film Providing Wholesome Entertainment National Film Award